is an Echizen Railway Mikuni Awara Line railway station located in the city of Fukui, Fukui Prefecture, Japan.

Lines

Station layout
The station consists of  one side platform serving a single bi-directional track. The station is unattended.

Adjacent stations

History
Yatsushima Station was opened on December 30, 1928. On September 1, 1942 the Keifuku Electric Railway merged with Mikuni Awara Electric Railway. Operations were halted from April 20, 1944. The station reopened on September 1, 2007 as an Echizen Railway station.

Surrounding area
The surrounding area is primarily residential. To the east lies a small shopping center and the Awara Kaidō (Fukui / Ishikawa Prefectural Route 5).
Other points of interest include:
Tōmyōji Nawate Nitta Yoshisada War Memorial
Fukui City Fujishima Junior High School
Fukui Prefecture Budōkan

See also
 List of railway stations in Japan

References

External links

  

Railway stations in Fukui Prefecture
Railway stations in Japan opened in 1928
Mikuni Awara Line
Fukui (city)